Pakistan Steel Football Club is a Pakistani football club affiliated with Pakistan Steel Mills and is based outside the city of Karachi in the Pakistan Steel Township.

Career 
It played in the 2008–09 Pakistan Premier League after winning promotion by coming in second in the 2007–08 Football Federation League. It is playing in the 2020-21 Football Federation League.

Team
Muhammad Akram (Captain), Abdul Hafeez (Vice-Captain), Haroon Rasheed, Mamoon Rasheed, Fazal Hussain, Muhammad Tariq, Abrar Ahmed, Muhammad Maqbool, Nadir Ali, Muhammad Bux, Muhammad Arshad, Kareem Bakhsh, Sarfraz, Muhammad Illyas, Muhammad Tariq, Nasir Ahmed, Muhammad Akmal, Najeeb Hassan, Naveed Raza, Aamir Wali Khan, Adnan Iqbal, Baseer Ahmed and Abdul Wahab.

Football clubs in Pakistan
Works association football clubs in Pakistan
Football in Karachi